Eucalyptus exilipes, commonly known as the fine-leaved ironbark, is a species of medium to tall tree and is endemic to Queensland. It has dark grey or black "ironbark", linear to narrow lance-shaped adult leaves, flower buds in groups of seven, white flowers and cup-shaped to shortened spherical fruit. It is similar to E. crebra, differing only in the length of the pedicels.

Description
It has rough, dark grey to black ironbark. Flowering occurs in July and August and the flowers are white. This species is very similar to E. crebra, differing only slightly in the dimensions of the pedicels.

Taxonomy and naming
Eucalyptus exilipes was first formally described in 1987 by Ian Brooker and Anthony Bean from a specimen they collected in the White Mountains in 1985. The description was published in the journal Brunonia. The specific epithet (exilipes)  is derived from Latin words exilis meaning "slender", "thin" or "small" and 'pes' meaning "stem", and refers to the slender pedicels of this species.

Distributiont
The fine-leaved ironbark is only known from a few locations in north Queensland, including the White Mountains, Blackbraes National Park and north of Cooktown.

Conservation status
Eucalyptus exilipes is classified as "least concern" under the Queensland Government Nature Conservation Act 1992.

See also
List of Eucalyptus species

References

Trees of Australia
exilipes
Myrtales of Australia
Flora of Queensland
Taxa named by Ian Brooker